Albert J. Fitzgerald (1906-April 3, 1982) was an American trade unionist from Lynn, Massachusetts. Fitzgerald was a leading in the United Electrical, Radio and Machine Workers of America (UE) and Congress of Industrial Organizations (CIO). He was President of UE starting in 1941 after defeating James B. Carey until his retirement in 1978. During his time as UE President, the organization was expelled from the CIO for alleged communist domination. The union continued organizing as an independent union thereafter and survived raiding and rebuke from other unions.

References

1906 births
1982 deaths
People from Lynn, Massachusetts
Trade unionists from Massachusetts
American trade union leaders
United Electrical, Radio and Machine Workers of America people
Congress of Industrial Organizations people